Reefton is a small town in the West Coast region of New Zealand, some 80 km northeast of Greymouth, in the Inangahua River valley. Ahaura is 44 km south-west of Reefton, Inangahua Junction is 34 km to the north, Maruia is 63 km to the east, and the Lewis Pass is 66 km to the south-east.

In 1888, it was the first town in New Zealand and the Southern Hemisphere to be lit by electricity, generated by the Reefton Power Station. Reefton was a thriving gold mining town in the late 19th century, and gold mining lasted from the 1870s to the 1950s. Its economy is based on tourism, forestry, coal mining and farming.

Reefton is home to the Inangahua County Library.

Name
The rich veins of gold found in a quartz reef near the town led to its name, originally spelled "Reef Town". Two nicknames in use soon after it was founded were "Rest Town" and "Quartzopolis". The main street, Broadway, was named after West Coast magistrate Charles Broad. The nearby Wealth of Nations mine was named after Adam Smith's book because the gold been discovered by another Adam Smith (no relation).

History 
 1866 – Alluvial gold discovered in the Īnangahua Valley
 1870 – Quartz reefs discovered at Reefton
 1872 – Reefton Hospital opened
 1886 – Reefton School of Mines opened
 1888 – Town electricity supply commenced
 1892 – Railway line opened
 1908 – Rail line to Cronadun opened
 1912 – Mine workers locked out
 1967 – Rail passenger services ceased

Gold mining 

Alluvial gold was first discovered near the town in 1866; the major discovery of gold in quartz reefs was made in 1870 and gold was being extracted by 1872. Mining from quartz reefs only took place at Reefton and Lyell.

An earlier settlement, known as Ross Town, had been established on the opposite bank of the Inangahua River around 1870, but most businesses shifted across the river in 1871 to be nearer the quartz mining. There were mines at nearby locations such as Waiuta and Blacks Point.

There was a downturn in the industry in the 1880s due to lack of money to develop deeper mines. Consolidated Goldfields New Zealand formed in 1896 and ran several mines. Technology was modernised and the Reefton School of Mines opened in 1887 to apply more scientific knowledge to mining.

Gold mining at Reefton ceased in 1951.

Electricity 
In 1888 Reefton became the first town in New Zealand and the Southern Hemisphere to receive electricity, the work of Walter Prince, and its streets were lit by commercial electricity generated by the Reefton Power Station. The power station was demolished in 1961 but the Reefton Power House Charitable Trust Inc has raised $4.5 million  for a restructure  project, and work started on buildings and a  water race in 2019.

Geography

Climate 
Located in the Inangahua Valley at an altitude of 194m, Reefton falls under the Köppen-Geiger climate classification of Cfb (Oceanic). At an 
average temperature of 15.9 °C, February is the warmest month. July is the coldest month, at 6.8 °C. Reefton's average annual temperature is 11.4 °C. On average, snowfall occurs on 1.4 days annually, and an average of 22.1 days per year will exceed 26.7 °C (80 °F).
During an average winter, Reefton can expect to see 47 days of frost.

Demographics

Reefton had a population of 927 at the 2018 New Zealand census, a decrease of 129 people (-12.2%) since the 2013 census, and a decrease of 54 people (-5.5%) since the 2006 census. There were 447 households. There were 471 males and 456 females, giving a sex ratio of 1.03 males per female. The median age was 51.9 years (compared with 37.4 years nationally), with 132 people (14.2%) aged under 15 years, 120 (12.9%) aged 15 to 29, 453 (48.9%) aged 30 to 64, and 222 (23.9%) aged 65 or older.

Ethnicities were 90.0% European/Pākehā, 13.3% Māori, 1.0% Pacific peoples, 2.9% Asian, and 2.6% other ethnicities (totals add to more than 100% since people could identify with multiple ethnicities).

The proportion of people born overseas was 11.3%, compared with 27.1% nationally.

Although some people objected to giving their religion, 53.1% had no religion, 32.0% were Christian, 0.3% were Muslim and 1.9% had other religions.

Of those at least 15 years old, 63 (7.9%) people had a bachelor or higher degree, and 246 (30.9%) people had no formal qualifications. The median income was $22,900, compared with $31,800 nationally. The employment status of those at least 15 was that 306 (38.5%) people were employed full-time, 117 (14.7%) were part-time, and 24 (3.0%) were unemployed.

Economy 
Gold mining recommenced in 2007 when Oceana Gold opened a new mine. In 2013 it employed 260 people. The mine closed in 2016 and Oceana Gold has undertaken an environmental rehabilitation programme at the site.

A new gold mine is planned to open in 2024, it is expected to employ 100 people.

Other industries in the town are coal mining, forestry, tourism and servicing the farming industry.

Transport
Reefton is located at the intersection of State Highway 7 and State Highway 69.

Rail 
Reefton is located on the Stillwater–Westport Line railway, which diverges from the Midland Line in Stillwater. On 29 February 1892, the line was opened to Reefton, but it terminated on the southern bank of the Inangahua River opposite the town. Early in the 20th century, a bridge was built across the river and the present-day station established in Reefton. The line was opened beyond Reefton to Cronadun in 1908, but it was not until 5 December 1943 that the line officially became a through route to Westport, though trains had been operating the length of the line since July 1942. On 3 August 1936, a railcar passenger service began operating in the morning between Hokitika and Reefton utilising small Leyland diesel railcars, but low patronage meant this service ceased to operate all the way to Reefton in August 1938. In the early 1940s, much larger Vulcan railcars were introduced to New Zealand and they provided two services to Reefton: one local service from Greymouth that terminated in Reefton, and a service that ran between Westport and Stillwater to connect with the West Coast Express. In 1967, all passenger services through Reefton ceased. Today, the primary traffic on the railway is coal, with multiple coal trains operating daily.

Education
The first state school in Reefton was founded in 1878, and there were once 24 schools in the area.

It is a state integrated Catholic school. Both schools are coeducational.

Broadcast and print media
The first newspaper to be printed in Reefton was the Inangahua Herald and New Zealand Miner, which began as a twice-weekly paper in February 1872, its joint owner being Joseph Ivess, who went on to found many other newspapers. It was appearing three times a week by 1874 and became a daily in 1894. Its owner and editor from 1909 was Maud L. G. Beresford Wilkinson.

Its main rival, the Inangahua Times, was established by William Joseph Potts in 1875. Potts was editor of Ahaura's Grey Valley Times in 1873, and in 1874 he started the short-lived Reefton Courier and Inangahua Advertiser which survived only to the end of the year, and was the predecessor of the Times. The Times initially appeared three times a week, but by 1891 was a daily. Potts owned the Times until his death in 1901, and his wife Mary Potts was editor from 1897 to 1905.

For a short time Reefton, with a population of just 2000 and a circulation area of 4648, was home to three competing daily papers: the third, the Reefton Guardian, was first published in 1888, and was bought out by the Inangahua Times in 1894. All three papers were served for more than fifty years by the compositor, editor, and publisher James Noble, who started at the Guardian and eventually became editor and publisher of the Times. The Herald succumbed to the Depression in 1936 and merged with the Times in 1936. After James Noble the Times was run by Ernest Nicholson until it ceased publication on 6 June 1942, a casualty of war shortages. It was revived in 1946 by Reefton's Presbyterian minister Rev. C. R. (Bob) Sprackett as the Inangahua-Murchison Times, printed in Greymouth, which survived as a weekly until 1956.

Locally received radio stations include repeaters of both The Hits from Greymouth and Coast FM from Westport. The Greymouth Star newspaper is also received daily in the town.

Notable people

 Marty Banks – rugby union player, born and grew up in Reefton
Amy Castle – museum curator and entomologist, born in Reefton
Myra Cohen – barber, dental assistant, entertainer and milliner
Elisabeth Croll – anthropologist, born in Reefton
Phill Jones – basketball player, grew up in Reefton
Melanie Nolan – labour and gender historian, born in Reefton
Edward Smyrk – cricketer, born in Reefton

Gallery

References

External links

 Reefton i-SITE Visitor Centre
 Department of Conservation – Reefton short walks
 Reefton Area School

Buller District
Populated places in the West Coast, New Zealand
West Coast Gold Rush